This is a list of Spanish television related events from 1964.

Events
 26 March: Jesús Aparicio-Bernal is appointed Director General of RTVE.
 29 March: The show Reina por un día, debuts in TVE, becoming a real bis success that season.
 18 July: Official inauguration of the new headquarters of TVE, Studios in Prado del Rey, Madrid.

Debuts

Television shows

Ending this year
 Fiesta brava (1959-1964) 	
 Gran parada (1959-1964) 
 Gran teatro (1960-1964)
 Amigos del martes (​1961-1964) 	
 Aventura de la música, La (​1963-1964) 	
 Barquito de papel, El (​1963-1964) 	
 Campeones (​1963-1964) 	
 Concertino (​1963-1964) 	
 Enigma (​1963-1964) 	
 Fernández, punto y coma (​1963-1964) 	
 Graderío (​1963-1964) 	
 Hombre, ese desconocido, El (​1963-1964) 	
 ¿Quién tiene la palabra? (​1963-1964) 	
 Ronda de España (​1963-1964)

Foreign series debuts in Spain 
 McHale's Navy (Barco a la vista) (USA)
 The Dick Powell Show (Dick Powell) (USA)
 The Dick Van Dyke Show (USA)
 Top Cat (Don Gato) (USA)
 Dr. Kildare (Doctor Kildare) (USA)
 Cheyenne (USA)
 Fireball XL5 (El Capitán Marte y el XL5) (UK)
 The Virginian (El virginiano) (USA)
 The Untouchables (Los intocables) (USA)
 The Yogi Bear Show (El oso Yogi) (USA)
 The Patty Duke Show (USA)
 The Bugs Bunny Show (USA)
 The DuPont Show with June Allyson (USA)

Births
 6 January - Inka Martí, hostess.
 11 January - Ramón Arangüena, host.
 8 March - Silvia Marsó, actress.
 1 May - Paco Tous, actor.
 3 May - Maru Valdivieso, actress.
 13 May - Jordi Sánchez, actor.
 29 May - Christina Rosenvinge, singer and hostess.
 25 June - Emma Suárez, actress.
 26 August - Silvia Espigado, actress.
 1 September - Almudena Ariza, journalist.
 3 September - Elena Martín, actress and comedian.
 10 September - Ginés García Millán, actor.
 13 September - Ana García Lozano, hostess.
 14 October - Pere Ponce, actor.
 21 October - Gloria Serra, journalist.
 7 November - Juan Pedro Valentín, journalist.
 11 November - Anabel Alonso, actress.
 Álex Casanovas, actor.
 Benjamin Barrington, host.
 Marisa Martín Blázquez, journalist.
 Pedro Rollán, actor and host.

See also
1964 in Spain
List of Spanish films of 1964

References